Aahoo Jahansouzshahi (born ), known professionally as Sarah Shahi, is an American actress and former model. She played Carmen on The L Word in 2005, Kate Reed in the USA Network legal drama Fairly Legal (2011–2012), and Sameen Shaw on the CBS crime drama Person of Interest (2012–2016). She has also appeared in the main role Det. Dani Reese in Life, and in a supporting role in Alias. In 2018, she starred in the series Reverie.
In 2019, she appeared in a recurring role in City on a Hill on Showtime and appeared in seven episodes of the series The Rookie as romantic interest Jessica Russo.

Early life
Her father is from Iran. Her father's family left Iran two years before the Iranian Revolution. Her father, who was working at the American embassy in Iran, was slated for execution when the last Shah's regime collapsed in 1979, but was able to flee the country. Her mother was born in Spain, to an Iranian father and a Spanish mother. Shahi has an older brother, Cyrus, and a younger sister, Samantha, who is a production assistant. Her birth name, Aahoo, means 'deer' in Persian.
Shahi adopted Sarah as her name in second grade after hearing a song called "Sarah" because she was "tormented" by other children about her birth name, Aahoo. At her father's behest, she grew up speaking Persian, in addition to English. Shahi's parents began entering her in beauty pageants at the age of eight. Shahi attended Trinity High School,  and Southern Methodist University. She was a member of Alpha Chi Omega during her time at SMU. Shahi won the Miss Fort Worth pageant in 1997. Hoping to become an actress, she joined the Dallas Cowboys Cheerleaders (1999–2000) squad despite not having cheered before. Later, she moved to Los Angeles.

Career

While working as an extra on the set of Dr. T and the Women in Texas, Shahi met director Robert Altman, who encouraged her to move to Hollywood, where she received roles in several series, including Alias, Dawson's Creek, Reba, and Supernatural. In 2005 she appeared in the supporting character role of DJ Carmen de la Pica Morales on The L Word, which she joined in its second season. Shahi's two-year contract was not renewed after the end of the fourth season, and her character was written out.

Shahi was named number 90 on the Maxim "Hot 100 of 2005" list, moving up to number 66 in 2006 and 36 in 2012. She appeared on the cover of Maxims 2012 'TV's Hottest Girls' Issue in October 2012. She ranked number 5 on the AfterEllen.com hot list in 2007.

She played Farah in the second season of Sleeper Cell, and also appeared in HBO's The Sopranos in 2007, in the Season 6b episode "Kennedy and Heidi" as Sonya Aragon, a stripper and college student who spends a weekend with Tony after a death in his family. In 2007, she secured a small role in Rush Hour 3 as Zoe, a scantily clad rich girl who is pursued by Chris Tucker's character, Detective Carter.

In 2007, she took on her first permanent leading role on a TV series, co-starring with Damian Lewis in the NBC series Life as homicide detective Dani Reese. The series ran for two seasons.

In October 2009, Shahi landed the lead role in the USA Network pilot, Facing Kate. Shahi began filming in November 2009. The show followed the life of Kate Reed, a legal mediator who is frustrated with the bureaucracy and injustice she witnesses in the legal system. The series title was later changed to Fairly Legal. The show was cancelled after two seasons in November 2012.

Shahi was cast as a recurring love interest for Taylor Kinney's character Lt. Kelly Severide on NBC's show Chicago Fire in October 2012. She was cast in the recurring role of Sameen Shaw on Person of Interest, making her first appearance in the second season episode "Relevance", which aired in February 2013. In May 2013, CBS President Nina Tassler announced that Shahi would be added as a series regular for its third season. She played the daughter of Sylvester Stallone's character in the 2012 action film Bullet to the Head. Her co-star on this film was Jason Momoa, who she worked with again in the 2014 film Road to Paloma. Following the January 7, 2015, episode of Person of Interest, Shahi and the show's producers announced she would be going on maternity leave.

In February 2016, she was cast as iconic detective Nancy Drew in a planned TV series based on the books. In May 2016, CBS passed on the series. Also in May, Shahi resumed her appearances as Shaw on Person of Interest, until June 21, 2016, when the show ended. She starred in the new TV series Reverie in 2018, but it was cancelled after one season.

In 2019, Shahi joined the cast of Showtime's City on A Hill as recurring character Rachel Behnam, an investigator for the district attorney.
 
In August 2020, Shahi started filming Sex/Life, a Netflix series inspired by BB Easton's book "44 Chapters About 4 Men", in Toronto, Canada. She plays Billie, a housewife struggling to remain a devoted wife and mother when tempted by an old flame and the freer days of her youth. In October, she was cast as Adrianna Tomaz in the 2022 DCEU film Black Adam opposite Dwayne Johnson and Pierce Brosnan.

Personal life
Shahi married actor Steve Howey on February 7, 2009, in Las Vegas. In July 2009, she gave birth to their first child, a son, during an at-home water birth. In January 2015, she announced that she was pregnant with twins. In March, a daughter and son were born during another home birth. Shahi and Howey filed for divorce in May 2020. Their divorce was finalized in January 2021. 

In 2020, Shahi began dating Australian actor Adam Demos, whom she met on the set of Sex/Life.

Shahi studied karate in her youth becoming a 1st dan black belt in Shorin-Ryu karate.

In 2016, Shahi and Howey were sued by a former nanny of their children for sexual harassment and religious discrimination. The lawsuit claimed Shahi mocked her Islamic customs of dress and fasting. The lawsuit also alleged sexual harassment, with Shahi sharing a lewd photograph with the nanny, and grabbing her backside commenting "you have a perfect little butt." In 2017, the nanny asked for the case to be dismissed.

Filmography

Film

Television

References

External links

 
 
 
 

1980 births
20th-century American actresses
21st-century American actresses
Actresses from Texas
American cheerleaders
American female models
American film actresses
American people of Iranian descent
American people of Spanish descent
American television actresses
American voice actresses
Living people
National Football League cheerleaders
People from Euless, Texas
Qajar dynasty
Southern Methodist University alumni